Grotto Hills is a range of hills in the Lanfair Valley of San Bernardino County, California.

References

Landforms of San Bernardino County, California